Little Cranberry Lake, Annapolis  is a lake of Annapolis County, Nova Scotia, Canada.

See also
List of lakes in Nova Scotia

References
 National Resources Canada

Lakes of Nova Scotia